American music during World War II was considered to be popular music that was enjoyed during the late 1930s (the end of the Great Depression) through the mid-1940s (through the end of World War II).

Radio and accessibility
By 1940, 80% of American households would own a radio; making American music far more accessible to civilians and soldiers alike. Although the radio could be used to boost American morale, the American Government censored radio channels in fear that enemy agents may be sending coded messages through song requests on the stations.

Popular songs
Unlike many World War I songs, many World War II songs focused more on romance and strength instead of propaganda, morale, and patriotism. Songs that were overly patriotic or militaristic were often rejected by the public.

Popular singers of the era included Frank Sinatra, Ella Fitzgerald, the Andrews Sisters and Bing Crosby. Notable wartime radio songs were Boogie Woogie Bugle Boy,  Shoo Shoo Baby, I'm Making Believe, I'll Be Seeing You, and I'll Be Home for Christmas.

Songs that ridiculed the Axis Powers were also popular. These songs include We'll Knock the Japs Right into the Laps of the Nazis, Yankee Doodle Ain't Doodlin' Now, You're a Sap, Mr. Jap, and Oliver Wallace's song Der Fuehrer's Face, popularly recorded by Spike Jones, itself inspiring a 1943 Walt Disney cartoon starring the fictional character Donald Duck. A notable trend with songs that targeted the Axis powers was that for the songs directed towards Europe, the songs focused on Hitler and the Nazis as opposed to the civilians. On the other hand, songs that were directed towards the Pacific showed blatant racism, hate, anger, and revenge following the Pearl Harbor attack.

Swing music
Swing music was a notable example of wartime radio music. Even Nazi Germany fielded some swing music bands despite Hitler's objections to "decadent Western music." After the end of World War II, this music escalated until the paranoia of the Cold War made this kind of music irrelevant after the Soviet menace (under Joseph Stalin) replaced the Nazi menace (under Adolf Hitler). Lawrence Welk would later play this kind of music on The Lawrence Welk Show. Jazz music would also become part of the "cultural war" that raged alongside the actual fighting of World War II. Having its roots in African-American music, the Nazi regime had declared it to be "inhuman music" and banned it in all of occupied Europe. The local musicians of Paris, France chose to play jazz music in French rather than in English as a loophole in the Nazi jazz music ban. Rebellious German kids would meet in secret locations and listen to Allied music stations to hear jazz music behind the Gestapo's metaphorical back. This generation of German kids saw jazz music as a "religion worth fighting for."

References

Further reading
 Bell, David H. ; Carnelia, Craig ; Terkel, Studs. The good war : a musical collage of World War II. New York : Theatrical Rights, [2008]. . 
 Bloomfield, Gary L. ; Shain, Stacie L. ; Davidson, Arlen C. Duty, honor, applause : America's entertainers in World War II. Guilford, Conn. : Lyon's Press, 2004.  . .
 Bolden, Tonya. Take-off! : American all-girl bands during WW II. New York : Knopf, 2007. . . 
 Braverman, Jordan. To hasten the homecoming : how Americans fought World War II through the media. Lanham, Md. : Madison Books, 1996. . . 
 Ciment, James ; Russell, Thaddeus. The home front encyclopedia : United States, Britain, and Canada in World Wars I and II. Santa Barbara, Calif. : ABC-CLIO, 2007. . .   
 Erenberg, Lewis A.; Hirsch, Susan E. The war in American culture : society and consciousness during World War II. Chicago : University of Chicago Press, 1996. . .
 Fauser, Annegret. Sounds of war : music in the United States during World War II. New York : Oxford University Press, [2013]. . .
 Heide, Robert ; Gilman, John. Home front America : popular culture of the World War II era. San Francisco : Chronicle Books, 1995. . .    
 Jones, John Bush. The songs that fought the war : popular music and the home front, 1939–1945. Waltham, Mass. : Brandeis University Press, 2006. . .
 Krummel, Donald William. Resources of American music history : a directory of source materials from Colonial times to World War II. Urbana : University of Illinois Press, 1981. . .
 Lee, Vera. The black and white of American popular music : from slavery to World War II. Rochester, Vt. : Schenkman Books, 2007. . . 
 Recorded Anthology of American Music, Inc. Praise the Lord and pass the ammunition : Songs of World Wars I & II. Recorded Anthology of American Music, 1977. . 
 Root, Deane L. Voices across time : American history through music. [Pittsburgh] : Center for American Music, University of Pittsburgh, 2004. .
 Sforza, John. Swing it! : the Andrews Sisters story. Lexington, Ky. : University Press of Kentucky, 2000. . .         
 Sullivan, Jill M. Bands of sisters : U.S. women's military bands during World War II. Lanham, Md. : Scarecrow Press, 2011. . .  
 Young, William H. ; Young, Nancy K. Music of the World War II era. Westport, Conn. : Greenwood Press, 2008. . .  
 Young, William ; Young, Nancy K. World War II and the postwar years in America : a historical and cultural encyclopedia. Santa Barbara, Calif. : ABC-CLIO, 2010. . .
Winkler, Sheldon. "The Music of World War II: War Songs and Their Stories," Merriam Press, Hoosick Falls, New York, 3rd edition, .

External links
WWII In American Music.
World War II Propaganda, Cartoons, Film, Music, & Art
Big Band in the Barracks: Looking Back At The Music of WWII and the Greatest Generation.
Music During the World War II Years.

United States home front during World War II
1930s in American music
1940s in American music
1950s in American music